Veliky Perevoz is a rural locality (a selo) in Starooskolsky District, Belgorod Oblast, Russia. The population was 45 as of 2010. There are 3 streets.

Geography 
Veliky Perevoz is located 18 km south of Stary Oskol (the district's administrative centre) by road. Sumarokov is the nearest rural locality.

References 

Rural localities in Starooskolsky District